Transmembrane protein 101 (TMEM101) is a protein that in humans is encoded by the TMEM101 gene. The TMEM101 protein has been demonstrated to activate the NF-κB signaling pathway. High levels of expression of TMEM101 have been linked to breast cancer.

Gene

Aliases 
Known aliases of TMEM101 include Putative NF-Kappa-B-Activating Protein 130, FLJ23987, and MGC4251.

Location 
TMEM101 is located on the minus strand of the long arm of human chromosome 17 at the locus 17q21.31. The gene is 12,758 bp long, and it ranges from position 44,011,188 to position 44,023,946 on chromosome 17. TMEM101 is located between the genes NAGS and LSM12.

Transcript Variants 
NCBI RefSeq contains five mRNA transcript variants for TMEM101. Transcript variants 1, 2, and 3 have been found experimentally, while transcript variants X1 and X2 have been predicted computationally. The last three exons of all five transcript variants are identical. The second exon is identical in transcript variants 2 and 3. The first exon of variant X1 and the second exon of variant X2 are nearly identical to the second exon of variants 2 and 3, but both contain an additional segment of bases at the 3’ end of this exon, and the first exon of variant X1 has 6 extra bases on the 5’ end. The first exon differs considerably in length between variants 2, X2, and 3.

Protein

Isoforms
There are two known isoforms of the TMEM101 protein. Isoform a is encoded by transcript variant 1, while isoform b is encoded by transcript variants 2 and 3. Transcript variants X1 and X2 are also predicted to encode isoform b. Isoform b lacks the first 58 amino acids following the N-terminus of isoform a, but the remaining 199 amino acids are identical to isoform a.

Protein Characteristics

Isoform a of the TMEM101 protein has a predicted molecular weight of about 29 kDa and a theoretical isoelectric point of about 9.6. In terms of amino acid composition, TMEM101 is relatively rich in the hydrophobic amino acids leucine and tyrosine, and relatively poor in the hydrophilic amino acids asparagine and threonine. It is also relatively poor in the sum of the two negatively charged amino acids, aspartic acid and glutamic acid.

Transmembrane Domains 
Isoform a of the TMEM101 protein contains 8 transmembrane domains.

Secondary Structure

The Ali2D, I-TASSER, and Phyre2 models all predict that the secondary structure of TMEM101 is predominately composed of alpha helices. The Phyre2 prediction is presented in the figure to the right.

Tertiary Structure

The I-TASSER highest confidence model for the predicted tertiary structure for the TMEM101 protein resembles the structure of a polytopic transmembrane alpha-helical protein.

Post-translational Modifications

Acetylation
The lysine at position 4 in the TMEM101 protein is predicted to be acetylated by the EP300 acetyltransferase enzyme.

Phosphorylation
There are five predicted phosphorylation sites located outside of transmembrane domains on the cytoplasmic side of the TMEM101 protein, which are listed in the table below.

Subcellular Localization
Immunofluorescent staining experiments have detected the TMEM101 protein in the plasma membrane and the nucleoplasm.

Regulation and Expression

Promoters
The Genomatix Gene2Promoter tool lists 7 promoter regions for the Homo sapiens TMEM101 gene. The promoter that is supported by the greatest number of mRNA transcripts is 1525 bp long and spans the base pairs 44014913–44016437 on the negative strand of human chromosome 17. This promoter overlaps the start of transcription of mRNA transcript variant 1.

Transcription Factors
The following table presents a selected list of transcription factors that are predicted by the Genomatix MatInspector tool to bind to the GXP_8985856 promoter.

Expression

Tissue Specificity
According to RNA-Seq data, TMEM101 is expressed in a wide range of tissues with low tissue specificity. Relatively, it is expressed most highly in breast tissue, the seminal vesicles, the kidneys, and endometrial tissue.

Embryonic Development
A cross section of a mouse embryo that has been stained for TMEM101 mRNA using in situ hybridization techniques shows noticeably lower levels of TMEM101 transcript in the liver than in other tissues.

Differential Expression
TMEM101 has been observed to be expressed at lower levels in ovarian endometriotic cells than in uterine endometrial cells within the same individuals.

TMEM101 has also been observed to be expressed at higher levels in estrogen receptor positive ovarian cancer tumors than in estrogen receptor negative ovarian cancer tumors in mouse xenograft models.

Interacting Proteins
The IntAct database indicates that the following proteins that have been found to interact with the TMEM101 protein through two-hybrid screening experiments.

Homology and Evolution

Orthologs and paralogs 
TMEM101 has orthologs in Mammalia, Sauropsida, Amphibia, Osteichthyes, Chondrichthyes, Mollusca, Annelida, Echinodermata, Cnidaria, and Placozoa, among others. A table of selected orthologs is listed below. There are no known paralogs of TMEM101.

Evolutionary History 
The most distantly related species to humans that possesses an ortholog of TMEM101 is Trichoplax adhaerens. Given that Ctenophorans do not possess orthologs of TMEM101, it appears that TMEM101 originated in the basal ParaHoxozoa clade after its divergence from Ctenophora approximately 948 million years ago. Based on a molecular clock analysis, the protein sequence of TMEM101 has on average evolved faster than Cytochrome c but slower than Fibrinogen alpha.

Function

Activation of NF-κB Signaling Pathway 
TMEM101 cDNA transcripts have been demonstrated to activate the transcription of NF-κB controlled genes in human embryonic kidney cells.

Clinical Significance 
TMEM101 has been noted as a biomarker of breast cancer. High expression of TMEM101 is associated with the Luminal molecular subtype of breast cancer. Additionally, high levels of TMEM101 are associated with an increased risk score for the diagnosis of early stage triple-negative breast cancer.

References